Kurakhove Power Station (also: Kurakhivska TES or Kurakhovskaya TES) is a thermal power plant on Volycha river  from Kurakhove in Donetsk Oblast, Ukraine.

The first Kurakhove power station went into service on July 6, 1941, but was soon rendered inoperable by German troops during World War II. On October 20, 1941, it was occupied by German troops, who destroyed it in their retraction in 1943. It was repaired soon thereafter and on August 12, 1946, it went into operation again. Further units were installed resulting in an output power of 400 MW. Between 1972 and 1975 7 new units, one with 200 MW, 6 with 210 MW went in service, which replaced the old one and which are after modernization in 2006 still in use.

330 kV-Line Donbas-Dnipro 
Kurakhovka power station is startpoint of a 330 kV-double-circuit power line of unusual design to Zaporizhzhia. The 330 kV-Line Donbas-Dnipro is a double-circuit 330 kV three-phase AC power line connecting the 330 kV-substation DD-330 in Zaporizhzhia with Kurakhove Power Station. The line, which was built in 1964, consists in most parts of its length of three parallel power lines, each consisting of pylons with two conductors. Hereby one three-phase AC system consists of the outermost power line and the conductor of the innermost power line, which is closest to it.

See also

 List of power stations in Ukraine

Coal-fired power stations in Ukraine